Enteromius baudoni is a species of tropical cyprinid freshwater fish from Central and Western Africa. It is found in western Africa, in the river basins of the Chad Basin, the Volta basin, the Niger River basin, the Gambia River basin, the Senegal River basin, the Sassandra River basin, and the Bandama River basin. In central Africa, it is found in the Ubangui River ecosystem. It was originally described by Belgian-British zoologist George Albert Boulenger as Barbus baudoni in 1918,  and the holotype, collected from Bangui, Central African Republic, is stored at the Muséum national d’Histoire naturelle in Paris. The species was originally classified in the Barbus genus, but was reclassified as belonging to the Enteromius genus in 2015 after examining extensive taxon, geographical, and genomic sampling of the species in the family Cyprinidae.

The fish grows to  standard length and many specimens contain 3 small spots that are aligned on the middle of the sides of the fish.  These spots are frequently linked with a distinct longitudinal band.  The caudal fin is forked and the fish has two pairs of barbels.

Enteromius baudoni are benthopelagic, potamodromous fish that are harvested for human consumption.  Threats to the species include deforestation, which leads to additions of silt in their ecosystem.  The species was evaluated in 2009, and found to be of Least Concern by the International Union for Conservation of Nature and Natural Resources.

The fish was named in honor of French colonial administrator Alfred Baudon (1875-1932), who sent to the British Museum (Natural History) his collection of fishes from the Shari River, including the type specimen of this fish.

References

Enteromius
Cyprinid fish of Africa
Freshwater fish of West Africa
Fish of Cameroon
Fish of the Central African Republic
Fish of Chad
Fish of the Democratic Republic of the Congo
Taxa named by George Albert Boulenger
Fish described in 1918